The chiefdoms of Hispaniola (cacicazgo in Spanish) were the primary political units employed by the Taíno inhabitants of Hispaniola (Taíno: Ayiti, Quisqueya, or Bohio) in the early historical era. At the time of European contact in 1492, the island was divided into five chiefdoms or cacicazgos, each headed by a cacique or paramount chief. Below him were lesser caciques presiding over villages or districts and nitaínos, an elite class in Taíno society.

The Taíno of Hispaniola were an Arawak people related to the inhabitants of the other islands in the Greater Antilles. At the time of European contact, they were at war with a rival indigenous group, the Island Caribs. In 1508, there were about 60,000 Taínos in the island of Hispaniola; by 1531 infectious disease epidemics and exploitation had resulted in a dramatic decline in population. 

The boundaries of each cacicazgo were precise. The first inhabitants of the island used geographic elements as references, such as major rivers, high mountains, notable valleys and plains. This enabled them to define each territory. Each was divided into cacique nitaínos, subdivisions headed by the cacique helpers. The entries below relate the territory of each former cacique to the modern-day departments of Haiti and the provinces of the Dominican Republic.

Chiefdom of Marién 

The cacicazgo  of Marién included the entire northwestern part of Hispaniola, bordered to the north by the Atlantic Ocean, the south by the cacicazgo of Jaragua, east by the cacicazgos of Maguá and Maguana, and west by the Windward Passage.

It was ruled by the cacique Guacanagaríx, with its capital located in El Guarico, near the present-day city of Cap-Haïtien. It was divided into 14 nitaínos. This cacicazgo was the first to welcome Christopher Columbus and to convert to Christianity.

The cacicazgo of Marién fought against the cacicazgo Mairena, which was aided by Caonabo of the cacicazgo of Maguana for control of the mythical 'Mother' goddess Iermao. The 'Mother' Iermao was the goddess of the cacicazgo of Marién, which means "body stone".

Geographic scope

Dominican Republic
 Dajabón
 Monte Cristi
 Santiago Rodríguez
 Valverde

Haiti
 Artibonite
 Centre
 Nord-Est
 Nord-Ouest
 Nord

Chiefdom of Maguá 

The cacicazgo of Maguá was located on the northeastern part of Hispaniola, bordered to the north and east by the Atlantic Ocean, the south by the cacicazgos of Maguana and Higüey, and west by the cacicazgos of Marién and Maguana. This chiefdom's territories are all in present-day Dominican Republic. 

It was ruled by the cacique Guarionex and was centered near the present location of Santo Cerro in La Vega. It was divided into 21 nitaínos. This cacicazgo was one of the richest of the island.

The territory was also inhabited by an ethnically distinct group of natives called the Ciguayo, who were concentrated on the Samaná Peninsula. This group, who spoke the Ciguayo language, was absorbed into the cacicazgo of Maguá. This was noted by chronicler Bartolomé de las Casas, who wrote that in 1502 the language was on the decline and by 1527 extinct. 

Maguá means "the Stone". The chiefdom's mother-goddess was Guacara or the 'Stone Mother'.

Geographic scope

Dominican Republic
 Duarte
 Espaillat
 La Vega
 María Trinidad Sánchez
 Monseñor Nouel
 Puerto Plata
 Hermanas Mirabal
 Samaná
 Sánchez Ramírez
 Santiago

Chiefdom of Maguana 

The cacicazgo of Maguana was located in the center of the island, bounded on the north by the cacicazgos of Marién and Maguá, south by the Caribbean, east by the cacicazgos of Maguá and Higüey, and west by the cacicazgos of Marién and Jaragua. This cacicazgos territories were all located in present-day Dominican Republic.

It was ruled by the cacique Caonabo, husband of Anacaona. Its center was established at Corral de los Indios located in the present day town of Juan de Herrera in San Juan province. It was divided into 21 nitaínos.

This was the principal cacicazgo of the island and was represented as "The Rock". The term Maguana means "the first stone" or "the only stone". The principal mother goddess of the chiefdom was Apito, which means "Mother of Stone".

The cacique Caonabo was the first to resist the Spanish occupation. The fort that Christopher Columbus established on the north coast of the island, La Navidad, was destroyed by Caonabo. Caonabo also attempted to sack Fortaleza de Santo Tomás, but was captured by Spanish forces led by commander Alonso de Ojeda. Instead of being condemned to death the cacique was sent to Spain to be paraded in front of the Royal Court but died on his voyage.

Geographic scope

Dominican Republic
 Azua
 Baoruco
 Elías Piña
 La Vega
 Peravia
 San Cristóbal
 San José de Ocoa
 San Juan
 Santiago

Chiefdom of Jaragua 

The cacicazgo of Jaragua spanned the entire south-west of the island of Hispaniola. It was bordered on the north by the cacicazgo of Marién, south by the Caribbean Sea, east by the cacicazgo of Maguana, and west by the Strait of Jamaica. It was ruled by the cacique Bohechio (Beehechio) and was the largest of the cacicazgos. Its center was located in a place called Guava, present-day Léogâne in Haiti. It was divided into 26 nitaínos. 

Bohechío was the brother of Anacaona, who was married to the cacique of Maguana; Caonabo. As such, Jaragua and Maguana had a strong alliance and would partner to ward off and attack rival cacicazgos.

The mother goddess of the cacicazgo was Zuimaco.

Geographic scope

Dominican Republic
 Baoruco
 Barahona
 Independencia
 Pedernales

Haiti
 Artibonite
 Grand'Anse
 Nippes
 Ouest
 Sud
 Sud-Est

Chiefdom of Higüey 

The cacicazgo  of Higüey spanned the entire southeast of Hispaniola, bordered to the north by the cacicazgo  of Maguá and the Bay Samana, south by the Caribbean, east by the Canal de la Mona, and west by the cacicazgo of Maguana. It was ruled by the cacique  and was divided into 21 nitaínos. The capital of the cacicazgo was located in present-day Higüey. 

Floyd states Cotubanama was the cacique of Higuey, who was captured by Juan de Esquivel and hanged in Santo Domingo.

The mother goddess of Higüey was Atabeira, which means "Mother of the original stone".

Geographic scope

Dominican Republic
 Distrito Nacional
 El Seibo
 Hato Mayor
 La Altagracia
 La Romana
 Monte Plata
 San Pedro de Macorís
 Santo Domingo

References

Bibliography 
 Las Casas, Bartolomé de (1552) Brevísima relación de la destrucción de las Indias, Axel Springer  SL
 Fombrun, Odette Roy (2006) History of my country, Haiti 1 
NAU, Charles Emile, baron (1854) "Histoire des Caciques d'Haïti" 

Indigenous topics of the Caribbean
History of Haiti
History of the Dominican Republic
History of indigenous peoples of North America
Taíno
Former chiefdoms in North America
Regions of the Caribbean